Triangle Park is a business district in Quezon City, Metro Manila, Philippines.

Triangle Park may also refer to:

Triangle Park (Lexington), a public park in Lexington, Kentucky, US
Triangle Park (Newark) or Mulberry Commons, a public park in Newark, New Jersey, US
Triangle Park (Dayton), a former football stadium, now a public park, in Dayton, Ohio, US
Research Triangle Park, in North Carolina, US